Matthew "Matt" Savage (born May 12, 1992) is an American autistic savant musician.

Early life 
Born in Sudbury, Massachusetts, he is the son of Diane and Lawrence "Larry" Savage.
Savage was a precocious infant who walked early and learned to read by the age of 18 months. He was diagnosed with pervasive developmental disorder, a form of autism, at age three. He did not like any noises or music during his early childhood.

At age six, Savage taught himself to read piano music. He studied classical piano for less than a year before discovering jazz, which became his main focus.

He and his younger sister, Kitty, were both home schooled.  He began studying at the New England Conservatory of Music in Boston, Massachusetts, in the fall of 1999.  He continued his classical studies as well.

Among Savage's talents are hyperlexia and perfect pitch. Coupled with his extremely high intelligence, these abilities have allowed him to achieve other distinctions as well, such as winning a statewide geography bee.

Career
Despite his young age and his autism, and even without formal instruction in musical composition, Savage is an accomplished musician and composer. He has released twelve albums as a solo performer, as leader of the Matt Savage Trio and as leader of various sized ensembles.  By the age of 14, he had also performed with Chaka Khan and other popular singers. His compositions are very approachable and often humorous.

Awards and appearances
Savage has received many awards, including being signed in 2003 to Bösendorfer pianos. He is the only child to be so recognized in the company's 188-year history.

Savage has toured the world, performing for heads of state and others, and appearing on numerous television and radio programs such as Late Show with David Letterman, Late Night with Conan O'Brien, The Today Show, and All Things Considered.  In 2006, at age 14, he was featured on a CNN report about the human brain, in which he was defined as a prodigious savant, as opposed to the other types of savants. Savage has also appeared in several documentaries about savants.

Collaborations and studies
In 2007, he played with Scottish folk songwriter/singer Al Stewart, on piano.

In 2009, Savage enrolled at Berklee for continued studies. The following year, in November, he prepared to release his ninth CD.

In December 2012, Savage received his Bachelor of Music (B.Mus.) in Performance (Piano) from Berklee College of Music.

In 2014, he composed and recorded the score for a full-length documentary film, Sound of Redemption: The Frank Morgan Story.

In May 2015, he received his Master of Music (M.Mus.) in Jazz Performance (Piano) from the Manhattan School of Music.

Currently, Savage balances his professional music career with teaching.

See also
 Child prodigy
 Nick van Bloss
 Tony Cicoria

References

External links
 Official website — contains a biography, press coverage, tour information, and store
 Profile of Matt Savage and other savants at Wisconsin Medical Society — includes videos of the Matt Savage Trio and an excerpt from the documentary Expedition ins Gehirn (Beautiful Minds: A Voyage Into the Brain)
 Podcast featuring "Our Town" by Matt Savage

1992 births
21st-century American pianists
American child musicians
Autistic savants
Berklee College of Music alumni
Living people
Musicians from Massachusetts
People on the autism spectrum
20th-century American pianists
American male pianists
20th-century American male musicians
21st-century American male musicians